"Pumps and a Bump" is a song by Hammer from his 1994 album The Funky Headhunter. The single peaked at No. 3 on the Billboard Hot Rap Songs chart and No. 26 on the Hot 100, making it the final Top 40 hit of Hammer's career.

Release and reception
"Pumps and a Bump" was the first single off The Funky Headhunter, which represented a departure from Hammer's previous pop image. The track contains a sample of George Clinton's 1982 single "Atomic Dog".

The original music video featured Hammer wearing nothing but a Speedo and dancing suggestively alongside numerous swimsuit-clad women, which resulted in it being banned from MTV as it was considered too graphic. An alternative video was filmed with Hammer fully clothed and featuring an appearance by Deion Sanders, while promoted as representing a remix of the song.

The video was nominated for Best Choreography at the 1994 MTV Video Music Awards.

Impact
In 2010, American Idol contestant Larry Platt performed his own song titled "Pants on the Ground", which Entertainment Weekly claimed sounded similar to "Pumps and a Bump". Spin magazine described the banned music video as "'Elvis on the Ed Sullivan Show' cranked to 11".

Chart positions

Additional chart positions: US R&B No. 21 / US Rap No. 3 / US Dance No. 34

Year-end charts

Certifications

References

1994 singles
MC Hammer songs
G-funk songs
1994 songs
Songs written by MC Hammer
Songs written by Garry Shider
Songs written by George Clinton (funk musician)
Giant Records (Warner) singles
Music video controversies